Berberis nilghiriensis is a species of plant in the family Berberidaceae. It is endemic to the Nilgiris of Tamil Nadu, India.

References

Endemic flora of India (region)
nilghiriensis
Critically endangered plants
Taxonomy articles created by Polbot